Theodore Benfey (June 11, 1871 - March 13, 1935) was a member of the Wisconsin State Senate.

Biography
Benfey was born on June 11, 1871, in Plymouth, Wisconsin. He graduated from high school in Sheboygan, Wisconsin. During the Spanish–American War, he served with the United States Army.

Political career
Benfey was elected to the Senate in 1916. Additionally, he was District Attorney of Sheboygan County, Wisconsin from 1899 to 1905 and a member of the Sheboygan City Council. He was a Republican.

References

Politicians from Sheboygan, Wisconsin
Republican Party Wisconsin state senators
Wisconsin city council members
District attorneys in Wisconsin
Military personnel from Wisconsin
United States Army soldiers
American military personnel of the Spanish–American War
People from Plymouth, Wisconsin
University of Wisconsin Law School alumni
1871 births
1935 deaths